Kennamer Cove is an unincorporated community and cove in Marshall County, Alabama, United States. Kennamer Cove is located on the side of Gunters Mountain, and was first settled circa 1814 by the Kennamer family. Many of the inhabitants of the cove joined the Union Army during the American Civil War. Kennamer Cove is known regionally for hosting one of the largest family reunions in Alabama. Cathedral Caverns State Park and Kennamer Cave, a cave owned and preserved by the Southeastern Cave Conservancy Inc., are both located in Kennamer Cove.

A post office was operated in Kennamer Cove from 1870 to 1909.

Notable people
 Charles Brents Kennamer, United States federal judge on the United States District Court for the Northern District of Alabama and the United States District Court for the Middle District of Alabama from 1931 to 1936
 Franklin Elmore Kennamer, United States federal judge on the United States District Court for the Northern District of Oklahoma, serving from 1925 to 1960

References

Unincorporated communities in Marshall County, Alabama
Unincorporated communities in Alabama